Carheart is the debut album by the Norwegian avant-garde metal/jazz rock band Virus.

Track listing
All songs written by Czral, Plenum and Esso, except where noted.
"Something Furry This Way Comes" – 1:36 (Czral, Plenum, Esso, Kim Sølve, Zweizz)
"Carheart" – 3:56
"Queen of the Hi-Ace" – 4:15 (Czral, Plenum, Esso, Yusaf Parvez)
"Road" – 5:44 (Czral, Plenum, Esso, Parvez)
"Gum Meet Mother" – 5:00
"Dogs With Wheels" – 1:33 (Czral, Plenum, Esso, Solve, Zweizz)
"It's All Gone Weird" – 5:39
"Kennel Crash Recovery" – 2:30 (Czral, Plenum, Esso, Solve, Zweizz)
"Hustler" – 5:19
"Bandit" – 4:32
"Be Elevator" – 8:49 (Czral, Plenum, Esso, Zweizz)

Personnel
Czral - Guitars, Vocals
Plenum - Bass
Esso - Drums
Aggie Peterson and Kristoffer Rygg (of Ulver) - Guest vocals on Queen of the Hi-Ace
Øyvind Hægeland (of Spiral Architect and Arcturus) - Guest vocals on Hustler

References

2003 albums
Virus (Norwegian band) albums